The 2021–22 Utah State Aggies men's basketball team represented Utah State University in the 2021–22 NCAA Division I men's basketball season. The Aggies, led by first-year head coach Ryan Odom, played their home games at the Smith Spectrum in Logan, Utah as members of the Mountain West Conference.

Previous season
In a season limited due to the ongoing COVID-19 pandemic, the Aggies finished the 2020–21 season 20–9, 15–4 in Mountain West play to finish in second place. In the Mountain West tournament, they defeated UNLV and Colorado State before losing to San Diego State in the championship game. They received an at-large bid to the NCAA tournament as the No. 11 seed in the South region, where they lost to Texas Tech in the first round.

Following the season, head coach Craig Smith left the school to accept the head-coaching position at Utah. Shortly thereafter, the school named UMBC head coach Ryan Odom the team's new head coach.

Offseason

Departures

Incoming transfers

2021 recruiting class

Roster

Schedule and results

|-
!colspan=9 style=| Exhibition

|-
!colspan=9 style=| Non-conference regular season

|-
!colspan=9 style=| Mountain West regular season

|-
!colspan=9 style=| Mountain West tournament

|-
!colspan=9 style=| NIT

Source

References 

Utah State
Utah State Aggies men's basketball seasons
Utah State Aggies Men's Basketball
Utah State Aggies Men's Basketball
Utah State